Dale Folsom Lewis (August 29, 1933 – August 30, 1997) was an American wrestler who competed in the Greco-Roman heavyweight division at the 1956 and 1960 Olympics. He won the 1959 Pan-American Games in this event.

Championships and accomplishments
American Wrestling Association
AWA Nebraska Heavyweight Championship (1 time)
AWA Midwest Heavyweight Championship (1 time)
AWA Midwest Tag Team Championship (3 times) - with Stan Pulaski (2) and Francis St. Claire (1)
George Tragos/Lou Thesz Professional Wrestling Hall of Fame
 Class of 2007
Georgia Championship Wrestling
NWA Georgia Heavyweight Championship (1 time)
St. Louis Wrestling Club
NWA United National Championship (1 time)
Championship Wrestling From Florida
NWA Brass Knuckles Championship (Florida version) 2 times
NWA Florida Heavyweight Championship (1 time)
World Championship Wrestling (Australia)
NWA Austra-Asian Tag Team Championship (9 times) - with Bob Griffin (1 time)

References

External links
 

1933 births
1997 deaths
People from Taylor County, Wisconsin
Oklahoma Sooners wrestlers
Olympic wrestlers of the United States
Wrestlers at the 1956 Summer Olympics
Wrestlers at the 1960 Summer Olympics
American male sport wrestlers
Pan American Games gold medalists for the United States
Pan American Games medalists in wrestling
American male professional wrestlers
Professional wrestlers from Wisconsin
Wrestlers at the 1959 Pan American Games
Medalists at the 1959 Pan American Games
AWA World Tag Team Champions
NWA Florida Heavyweight Champions
20th-century professional wrestlers
NWA Florida Tag Team Champions
NWA Brass Knuckles Champions (Florida version)
NWA United National Champions
NWA Austra-Asian Tag Team Champions
NWA Georgia Heavyweight Champions